North Park is one of 77 well-defined community areas of the City of Chicago. It is bordered by the North Shore Channel on the east, the Chicago River's North Branch and Foster Avenue on the south, Cicero Avenue on the west (except for the section in the northwest corner, north of Bryn Mawr Avenue, which is part of the Sauganash neighborhood) and Devon Avenue on the north.

Neighborhood

Originally a Swedish community and later a stronghold of Orthodox Jews, it more recently has been adopted by newer American immigrants, from Latinos to Middle Easterners, Koreans and Central Europeans (Poles). It is part of the 60625 and 60659 zip codes.

North Park received its name from North Park University that built the Old Main building in 1894 along Foster Avenue west of Kedzie, on the north side of the river. Further north is the campus of Northeastern Illinois University, which opened in 1961. Other major land uses include two large cemeteries, LaBagh Woods Forest Preserve, Peterson Pulaski Industrial Park, and North Park Village, which includes housing, park facilities, and a nature center.

The Good Counsel Province of the Polish Felician Sisters is headquartered in this neighborhood, as is Chicago's PBS station, WTTW, in the Chicago Production Center.  Two universities – North Park University and Northeastern Illinois University – and a Yeshiva make for concentrated educational resources.
The closest CTA 'L' station is the  Brown Line terminal.

North Park is in Jefferson Township, which was annexed into Chicago in 1889.

Economy
The Korean-American Chamber of Commerce is located at 5601 North Spaulding Avenue.

The education section of the Consulate-General of the People's Republic of China in Chicago is located at 3322 West Peterson Avenue, several blocks away from the rest of the consulate at 4747 West Peterson Avenue.

Politics
The North Park community area has overwhelmingly supported the Democratic Party in the past two presidential elections. In the 2016 presidential election, North Park cast 4,897 votes (70.02%) for Hillary Clinton and cast 1,799 votes (25.72%) for Donald Trump. In the 2012 presidential election, North Park cast 4,563 votes (66.40%) for Barack Obama and cast 2,199 votes for Mitt Romney (32.00%).

Notable people
 Seymour Simon (1915–2006), politician who served as President of the Cook County Board of Commissioners and a Justice of the Illinois Supreme Court. He resided in the Hollywood Park neighborhood for many years.

Schools

Public

Elementary
Mary G Peterson Elementary School
Hannah G Solomon Elementary School

High school
CICS Northtown Academy
Stephen Tyng Mather High School
Northside Learning Center
Northside College Prep
Von Steuben Metropolitan High School

Private

Elementary
 St Bernadette School
 Cheder Lubavitch Hebrew Day School
 Joan Dachs Bais Yaakov
 St Philip Evangelical Lutheran Church and School
 Wonder Montessori School

High school
 Bais Yaakov High School
 Telshe High School

Higher education
North Park University
North Park Theological Seminary
Northeastern Illinois University
Telshe Yeshiva

Library
Albany Park Library

See also

Chicago Public Schools

References

External links 

 Official City of Chicago North Park Community Map
 Lakeside Community Development Corporation

Community areas of Chicago